Lightman is a 2017 Indian Tamil feature film, written, produced and directed by Kumar G. Venkatesh. The film portrays the life of lightmen in cinema, portrayed by Karthik Nagarajan.

Cast 
Karthik Nagarajan as Guna 
Jennifer as Chitra
Govinda Swaminathan

References

 https://tamil.samayam.com/tamil-cinema/movie-review/light-man-movie-review/articleshow/57348996.cms
 https://gulfnews.com/life-style/celebrity/desi-news/south-india/lightman-is-for-the-unsung-heroes-1.1955780
 https://indianexpress.com/article/entertainment/tamil/prakash-raj-saddened-by-piracy-of-films-tamilrockers-4528775/
 https://vikatan.com/news/cinema/81055-lightman-movie-leaked-in-tamil-rockers-before-official-release.html

2010s Tamil-language films
2017 films